The British Motor Cars Invitational, also known as the 1973 BMC Invitational, was a women's tennis tournament that took place on indoor carpet courts at the Civic Auditorium in San Francisco in the United States. It was the third edition of the event and was held from January 16 through January 20, 1973. The singles final was watched by 5,3000 spectators who saw second-seeded Margaret Court win the title, earning $6,000 first-prize money.

Finals

Singles
 Margaret Court defeated  Kerry Melville 6–3, 6–3

Doubles
 Margaret Court /  Lesley Hunt defeated  Wendy Overton /  Valerie Ziegenfuss 6–1, 7–5

Prize money

References

BMC Invitational
British Motor Cars Invitational
Silicon Valley Classic
British Motor Cars Invitational
British Motor Cars Invitational